Thijs de Greeff (born 28 February 1982, in Amsterdam) is a Dutch field hockey player, who made his debut for the Men's National Team in 2005. He plays club hockey for HC Klein Zwitserland in The Hague and Bangalore Lions of the Premier Hockey League.

References
 Dutch Hockey Federation

1982 births
Living people
Dutch male field hockey players
Field hockey players from Amsterdam
HC Klein Zwitserland players